Babette Brown (1931 – 10 February 2019) was a South African writer on race and diversity issues who was based in the United Kingdom.

Brown was born in Johannesberg. She would Parktown High School for Girls, graduating from the University of the Witwatersrand with a bachelor's degree in education and from Enfield Polytechnic in 1975 with a bachelor's degree in education in sociology. She would marry Emanuel Brown in 1953.

Brown's books include Unlearning Discrimination in the Early Years (1998) and Combatting Discrimination: Persona Dolls in Action (2001). She wrote a children's book, Separation, based on her childhood in Apartheid South Africa.

In 1997, Brown won the Jerwood Award for her work with her charity EYTARN (Early Years Trainers Anti Racist Network).  She often wrote for Nursery World magazine.

References

1931 births
2019 deaths
South African emigrants to the United Kingdom
British non-fiction writers
South African non-fiction writers
South African women writers